Cavernularia is a genus of marine cnidarians in the family Veretillidae.

The genus contains bioluminescent species.

Species 
 Cavernularia capitata Williams, 1989
 Cavernularia chuni Kükenthal & Broch, 1911
 Cavernularia clavata Kükenthal & Broch, 1911
 Cavernularia dayi Tixier-Durivault, 1954
 Cavernularia dedeckeri Williams, 1989
 Cavernularia elegans (Herklots, 1858)
 Cavernularia glans Kölliker, 1872
 Cavernularia habereri Moroff, 1902
 Cavernularia kuekenthali Lopez Gonzalez, Gili & Williams, 2000
 Cavernularia lutkenii Kölliker, 1872
 Cavernularia malabarica Fowler, 1894
 Cavernularia mirifica Tixier-Durivault, 1963
 Cavernularia obesa Valenciennes in Milne Edwards & Haime, 1850
 Cavernularia pusilla (Philippi, 1835)
 Cavernularia vansyoci Williams, 2005

References

External links 
 marinespecies
 eol
 recif-france.com

Veretillidae
Octocorallia genera
Bioluminescent cnidarians